The 3500 Farms Scheme was a land development scheme to settle areas in the eastern Wheatbelt region of Western Australia south of Southern Cross in the late 1920s and early 1930s.

Planning
A conference was held in Perth to discuss the plan in detail, including the Premier Philip Collier, the Minister of Lands, and E. J. Mulvany of the Development and Migration Commission. Collier completed his proposal for the Federal Government in July 1929.

The scheme was a result of a tri-party arrangement between the State, Federal and Imperial Governments, with approval from the Development and Migration Commission. It was envisaged that the scheme would produce some 12 million bushels of wheat annually and graze an extra million sheep. The total cost of the project was estimated at over £4 million; it would employ some 2,000 men.
A 1929 survey indicated that farmers having sufficient water would be an issue. The land sloped south of the Goldfields Railway towards the south coast and was drained by saline depressions and rivers to the coast. The main depressions in the area were in the form of salt lakes or "lake country". Around 90% of the area is underlain by granite and soil formed from these rocks. There are numerous granite outcrops, some as large as several hundred acres. There was little jointing in the granite, meaning that boring for sub-surface water would be near impossible.

Salinity
Hartley Teakle produced a paper on alkali soils in 1928 and 1929. The report was released in early 1930 by Collier, causing much consternation in the state parliament. Professor James Arthur Prescott of the Council for Scientific and Industrial Research (later to become the CSIRO) confirmed Teakle's views on the inappropriateness of developing 3500 farms in his report released early in 1931.

Abandonment
The scheme was abandoned in 1930 by Great Britain due to natural soil salinity and a cause of further dryland salinity. The decision to abandon the scheme was also due to the commencement of the Great Depression rather than just the predicted salt problems. The decision to abandon the scheme was strongly criticised when it was made, mostly by existing settlers in the adjoining Lakes District.

References

Wheatbelt (Western Australia)